The fifth season of the NBC American supernatural drama series Grimm was announced on February 5, 2015. It premiered on October 30, 2015 and concluded on May 20, 2016. The season consisted of 22 episodes. The series was created by David Greenwalt, Jim Kouf and Stephen Carpenter, and produced by NBC, GK Productions, Hazy Mills Productions, and Universal Television. It follows a descendant of the Grimm line, Nick Burkhardt, as he deals with being a cop, and trying not to expose his secret as a Grimm.

Cast and characters

Main
 David Giuntoli as Nick Burkhardt
 Russell Hornsby as Hank Griffin
 Silas Weir Mitchell as Monroe
 Bitsie Tulloch as Juliette Silverton / Eve
 Reggie Lee as Sergeant Drew Wu
 Sasha Roiz as Captain Sean Renard
 Bree Turner as Rosalee Calvert
 Claire Coffee as Adalind Schade

Recurring
 Damien Puckler as Martin Meisner
 Jacqueline Toboni as Theresa "Trubel" Rubel
 Anne Leighton as Rachel Wood
 Michael Sheets as Andrew Dixon
 M. Ben Newman as Jeremiah Rogers
 Bailey Chase as Lucien Petrovich
 Danny Bruno as Bud Wurstner

Guest stars 
 Madeline Brewer as Billie Trump
 Elizabeth Rodriguez as Special Agent Kathryn Chavez
 Carlson Young as Selina Golias 
 Spencer Conway as Alexander
 Madeline Zima as Emily Troyer 
 Rick Overton as Felix Deitrich - Monroe's Uncle
 Lucy Paschall as Andrea Stroh
 Patrick Fabian as Dr. Eugene Forbes
 Shaun Toub as Conrad Bonaparte

Production

Casting 
Rodriguez returned as Chavez in the episode "The Grimm Identity", as she revealed on her instagram account. In late August, Carlson Young was cast as Selina Golias, a character forced to hide the survivor of an attack that resulted in her boyfriend's death, resulting in Selina becoming the target of a Wesen "Rat King" who doesn't mind if she becomes collateral damage in a never-ending Wesen feud. In early September, Madeline Brewer was cast as Billie Trump for episodes 6 and 7 of the season. Billie is a Skalengeck described as "a fierce lieutenant in an up-and-coming Wesen street gang who is raising hell in Portland." It was announced in November that Bailey Chase had been cast as Lucien Petrovich, "the leader of a Wesen revolutionary group." The news was broken by Deadline.

Filming
Like the previous four seasons, the majority of filming takes place in the Portland, Oregon area. Filming for the season began on July 7, 2015.

Broadcast
After airing the last 9 episodes of the previous season on Fridays at 8 p.m., the show moved back to its normal time slot of Fridays at 9 p.m.

Episodes

Ratings

References

2015 American television seasons
2016 American television seasons
Season 5